William Rattigan (1932 – 14 December 2019) was an Irish Gaelic footballer who played for club sides Dunshaughlin and Drumree and at inter-county level for the Meath county team.

Career

Rattigan began his football career with the Dunshaughlin club in the early 1950s. He became the first secretary of the Drumree club when it was re-formed in 1957 and was a key member of the team which won the junior championship in 1959. Rattigan was captain when Drumree won the intermediate championship in 1961 and was also involved in the intermediate championship win in 1969.

At inter-county level, Rattigan won a Leinster Championship medal in 1954 after lining out at left wing-forward in the final against Offaly. He later won an All-Ireland medal as a non-playing substitute following the 1-13 to 1-07 defeat of Kerry.

Honours

Drumree
Meath Intermediate Football Championship (2): 1961 (c), 1969
Meath Junior Football Championship (1): 1959

Meath
All-Ireland Senior Football Championship (1): 1954
Leinster Senior Football Championship (1): 1954

References

1932 births
2019 deaths
Dunshaughlin Gaelic footballers
Drumree Gaelic footballers
Irish gardeners
Meath inter-county Gaelic footballers